Microsoft Office 95 (version 7.0), also known as Microsoft Office for Windows 95, is a major release of Microsoft Office which was released on August 24, 1995, shortly after the completion of Windows 95. It was the successor to both Office 4.2 and 4.3 and was the first 32-bit version of Microsoft Office. While designed specifically for Windows 95, it was also compatible with Windows NT 4.0, which debuted in 1996. As it was a 32-bit program suite, it did not run on Windows 3.x or earlier versions of Windows, which used a 16-bit architecture. It was not officially supported on Windows NT 3.1 or Windows NT 3.5. It was officially supported on Windows NT 4.0, Windows ME and Windows 2000. Support for Windows XP or later versions of Windows was never officially provided, though it reportedly does run on XP and later versions of Windows.

Office 95 was succeeded by Office 97 on November 19, 1996.

Support for Microsoft Office 95 ended on December 31, 2001, the same day as Windows 95.

It is the last version of Microsoft Office to support Windows NT 3.51 RTM–SP4; as the following version, Microsoft Office 97 only supports Windows NT 3.51 SP5 or later.

Features
Microsoft Office 95 included six applications: Word (a word processor), Excel (a spreadsheet editor), PowerPoint (a presentation program), Access (a database management system), Schedule+ (a time management app) and Binder (a program for binding the work of the mentioned apps together). The CD-ROM version also included Microsoft Bookshelf.

True to its namesake, this suite was designed specifically for Windows 95. Previously, Microsoft had released Office 4.2 for Windows NT for several architectures, which included 32‑bit Word 6.0 for Windows NT and Excel 5.0 for Windows NT, but PowerPoint 4.0 and the Office Manager were 16‑bit. With Office for Windows 95, all components in the suite were 32-bit. All the Office 95 programs were OLE 2-enabled, meaning that they allowed interoperability between themselves, as well as all other applications that support this data interchange protocol. Binder used this protocol to bind OLE objects together.

Office for Windows 95 moved the version number of its applications to 7.0 to match Word's version number. Other components also bore the same version numbers to show that they were contemporaries, although their predecessors were not version 6.0. The previous versions of components were Word 6.0, Excel 5.0, PowerPoint 4.0, Schedule+ 1.0 and Access 2.0. Binder was a new app at the time with no predecessor.

The Office 95 programs utilized a two-tone gradient in the title bar at the top of the window, gradually turning from black at the left side to dark blue at the right. At the time, this was unique to Office 95, no other program running under Windows 95 or Windows NT utilized gradient title bars. This feature was eventually incorporated into the shell of Windows 98 and later, which would allow customizable gradient colors and extend the feature to include dialog boxes as well.

Microsoft Excel contained an easter egg, a hidden Doom–like game called Hall of Tortured Souls crediting the application's writers.

Contemporaneous components
Several additional programs were marketed as "compatible with Microsoft Office 95":
 Microsoft Project for Windows 95 (Version 4.1a)
 Microsoft Publisher for Windows 95 (Version 3.0)
 Microsoft FrontPage 1.1
 Office Small Business Pack for Office 95
 Small Business Financial Manager for Excel

Other contemporaneous Microsoft products were:
 Microsoft Works 4.0
 Microsoft Money 4.0

Editions

Office 95 was available in two versions. They contained the following applications:

Updates
Two updated versions, 7.0a and 7.0b were released to fix bugs in the applications, including a fix for a screen redraw problem in PowerPoint. The updates could be ordered from Microsoft Support. A downloadable update was released in 1999 to address issues related to the Year 2000 problem.

Issues 
Versions 3.0 and 3.5 of the Jet Database Engine, used by Access for Windows 95 (Access 7.0) and the later released Access 97 respectively, had a critical issue which made these versions of Access unusable on a computer with more than 1 GB of memory. While this problem was fixed for Jet 3.5/Access 97, it was never fixed for Jet 3.0 or Access 95.

System requirements
Microsoft Office 95 requires a 386DX or higher CPU, and either Windows 95 or Windows NT 3.51. It also requires 8 MB of RAM for typical use. Regarding hard disk space, compact installations require 28 MB, "typical" installations require 55 MB, and full installations require 88 MB.

References

1995 software
Office 95